Eparchy of Lipljan, later known as the Eparchy of Gračanica or the Eparchy of Novo Brdo is one of the former historical Eastern Orthodox eparchies of Serbian Orthodox located in the central parts of Kosovo region.. It is now part of Eparchy of Raška and Prizren.  In older research, it was mistakenly identified as the bishopric of Ulpiana.

History
In older research, the toponym of Lipljan was linked to Ulpiana, an important city of Roman antiquity. Archaeological and historiographical research in the recent decades has ruled out any links between the two sites.

After the successful Byzantine conquests of 1018 and the establishment of imperial rule in Bulgarian and Serbian lands, by the order of emperor Basil II a new and autonomous Archbishopric of Ohrid was created in 1019, under the supreme ecclesiastical jurisdiction the Patriarchate of Constantinople. Imperial charters of 1019 and 1020 mention the Bishopric of Lipljan among eparchies under the jurisdiction of the autonomous Archbishopric of Ohrid. Until the beginning of the 13th century, archbishops of Ochrid were titled as metropolitans of all Bulgaria and Serbia.

During 11th and 12th century Byzantines and Serbs fought several battles over the city of Lipljan. Sometime between 1185 and 1195, during the rule of Serbian "grand župan" Stefan Nemanja (1168-1196), Byzantine Empire finally ceded Lipljan to Serbia, but Eparchy of Lipljan still remained under the ecclesiastical jurisdiction of the Archbishipric of Ohrid.

Under the jurisdiction of Serbian Orthodox Church
The autocephaly of Orthodox Church in medieval Serbia was established in 1219 by Saint Sava who was consecrated as first Serbian archbishop by the Byzantine patriarch residing at that time in Nicaea. Since then, Eparchy of Lipljan was under the constant jurisdiction of Archbishop of Serbia. During the 13th century, bishops of Lipljan known by name were: Mavrojan, Varnava, Sava and Jovan. Eparchy had jurisdiction over counties of Lipljan, Binačka Morava and Topolnica. At the beginning of the 14th century, bishops of Lipljan were Antonije and Ignjatije. In that time, during the final years of the reign of Serbian king Stefan Milutin (1282-1321), the grand complex of the Monastery of Gračanica was built as the seat for bishops of Lipljan.

In 1346, Serbian Archbishopric was raised to the rank of Patriarchate with its see remaining in Peć. At the same time the Eparchy of Lipljan was raised by title to the rank of Metropolitanate. Bishops of Lipljan kept under their jurisdiction the region of central Kosovo with Gračanica and Novo Brdo. Period from the beginning of 13 century to the end of 14 century was the golden age for Orthodox Church in the region of central Kosovo with many monasteries and churches built by Serbian rulers and local Serbian nobility. In the middle of the 14th century, Bishop of Lipljan was Teodor, and second half of the 14th century, metropolitan of Lipljan was Simeon. In the first half of the 15th century, metropolitans of this eparchy were Dionisije and Dositej.

In the time of Turkish conquests, in the middle of the 15th century, Serbian Orthodox Church suffered great devastation. Region of Kosovo finally fell under Turkish rule around 1455. Metropolitan Venedikt of Lipljan had to flee from his eparchy, finding refuge at the Court of Serbian Despot Đurađ Branković in Smederevo. By the beginning of the 15th century, Eparchy of Lipljan was returned to the jurisdiction of Archbishopric of Ohrid. In the first half of 16. century, metropolitan of Lipljan was Nikanor (around 1530-1545).

Serbian Patriarchate was renewed in 1557 by patriarch Makarije Sokolović. In that time (16th–18th century), Eparchy of Lipljan remained under constant jurisdiction of Serbian Patriarchate. In the second half of the 16th century, metropolitans of Lipljan were Dionisije (around 1570) and Vasilije (around 1587-1598). In 1614, Metropolitan Pajsije of Lipljan became Serbian Patriarch. After him, Metropolitan of Lipljan was Longin (1616).

Two major events of that time tragically impacted Orthodox Church in the region of central Kosovo. During the Austro-Turkish war (1683–1699) relations between local Muslims and Christians in European provinces of Ottoman Empire were radicalized. As a result of Turkish oppression, destruction of Churches and Monasteries and violence against non-Muslim civilian population, Serbian Christians and their church leaders headed by Serbian Patriarch Arsenije III sided with Austrians in 1689 and again in 1737 under Serbian Patriarch Arsenije IV. In the following punitive campaigns, Turkish armies conducted systematic atrocities against local Christian population in Serbian regions, including central parts of Kosovo region, resulting in Great Migrations of the Serbs.

One of the consequences of devastation and depopulation in the regions of central Kosovo during austro-Turkish wars was the reorganization of local Serbian eparchies. At the beginning of the 18th century, the old Eparchy of Lipljan (with Gračanica and Novo Brdo) was merged with the Eparchy of Prizren and they remained united to the present day. In honor to the old Eparchy of Lipljan, auxiliary bishops in modern Eparchy of Raška and Prizren are bearing the title "Bishop of Lipljan"

Bishops and Metropolitans of Lipljan
This is an incomplete list of bishops and metropolitans of Lipljan.

Notes

References

Sources

External links
 The Princeton Encyclopedia of Classical Sites: Ulpiana
 Official site of the Eparchy of Raška and Prizren
 Official site of the Serbian Orthodox Church 
 List of Cultural Monuments in Serbia 
 Monasteries of the Eparchy of Raška and Prizren

Defunct religious sees of the Serbian Orthodox Church
Serbian Orthodox Church in Serbia
Serbian Orthodox Church in Kosovo
Cultural heritage of Kosovo